FK Zlatibor Čajetina is a professional football club based in Čajetina, Serbia. They compete in the Serbian First League, the second tier of the national league system.

History
In the 2013–14 season, the club won the Zlatibor District League with an amazing record, 25 wins and one draw (scoring 128 goals and conceding just six times in the process), thus earning promotion to the Drina Zone League. They spent the next two years in the fourth tier, before finishing first place in the 2015–16 edition, securing them a spot in the Serbian League West. The club won the third-tier championship in the 2017–18 campaign (being tied with Sloga Požega) and got promoted to the Serbian First League for the first time in its history. They also reached the Serbian Cup round of 16 in the same season, losing 1–0 to Čukarički. After spending two seasons in the second tier, the club finished in first place in the COVID-19-shortened 2019–20 season and earned promotion to the Serbian SuperLiga.

Honours
Serbian First League (Tier 2)
 2019–20
Serbian League West (Tier 3)
 2017–18
Drina Zone League (Tier 4)
 2015–16
Zlatibor District League (Tier 5)
 2013–14

Seasons

Players

First-team squad

Notable players
This is a list of players who have played at full international level.
  Miloš Krkotić
For a list of all FK Zlatibor Čajetina players with a Wikipedia article, see :Category:FK Zlatibor Čajetina players.

Managerial history

References

External links
 Club page at Srbijasport

1945 establishments in Serbia
Association football clubs established in 1945
Football clubs in Serbia